Amy Pharaoh (born 20 March 1979 in Grimsby), also known as Amy Gowshall and Amy Monkhouse, is an English international lawn and indoor bowler.

Personal life
In August 2002, she married and became Amy Monkhouse. She has since reverted to her birth name of Amy Gowshall but then remarried in 2022 to become Amy Pharaoh.

Career
Gowshall won a bronze medal in the Women's pairs at the 2002 Commonwealth Games in Manchester.

In 2004, she won the gold medal in the fours with Jayne Christie, Jean Baker and Ellen Falkner at the 2004 World Outdoor Bowls Championship.

She won a bronze medal at the 2006 Commonwealth Games before representing England at the 2010 Commonwealth Games where she won, with Ellen Falkner, a gold medal in the woman's pairs competition.

In 2007 she won the triples gold medal at the Atlantic Bowls Championships and in 2011 she won the fours gold medal at the Atlantic Championships.

In 2018, she won the National Two Wood Singles defeating Rebecca Field in the final and also finished runner-up to Sophie Tolchard in the 2018 National Singles

In 2022, under the name of Amy Pharaoh she competed at the 2022 Commonwealth Games in the women's singles and the women's pairs at the Games. In the pairs with Sophie Tolchard she secured a silver medal.

References

External links
 
 
  (2002)

1979 births
Living people
English female bowls players
Commonwealth Games medallists in lawn bowls
Commonwealth Games gold medallists for England
Commonwealth Games silver medallists for England
Commonwealth Games bronze medallists for England
Bowls players at the 2002 Commonwealth Games
Bowls players at the 2006 Commonwealth Games
Bowls players at the 2010 Commonwealth Games
Bowls players at the 2022 Commonwealth Games
Bowls World Champions
Indoor Bowls World Champions
Sportspeople from Grimsby
Medallists at the 2002 Commonwealth Games
Medallists at the 2006 Commonwealth Games
Medallists at the 2010 Commonwealth Games
Medallists at the 2022 Commonwealth Games